Río Abajo Fútbol Club is a Panamanian football team playing in the Liga Nacional de Ascenso.

The team is based in Panama City and represents Río Abajo neighborhood.

History
Río Abajo is the team that has won the most championships in the Liga Nacional de Ascenso with 3 titles, in 2008 and 2009 after defeating Orión twice 2–1 and 3–1 respectively. They have been defeated in the promotion playoff two years in a row. In 2008 they lost against Plaza Amador by a 3–2 aggregate score and on 2009 they were defeated by Alianza by 2–1 aggregate score.

In May 2012 they beat C.A.I. and got promoted to Liga Panameña de Fútbol. They were relegated back to the second level in April 2014.

Honours
Liga Nacional de Ascenso: 3
2008, 2009, 2011–12

Historical list of coaches
 Rubén Guevara  (2011 – Mar 13)
 Richard Parra (Sept 2013 – Feb 14)
 Juan Pablo Lopera (Feb 2014–)
 Rubén Guevara (Aug 2014–)

References

Football clubs in Panama
Association football clubs established in 1987
1987 establishments in Panama